Presidential elections were held in the United Arab Republic on 15 October 1970, following the death of the incumbent Gamal Abdel Nasser. The election took the form of a referendum on the candidacy of Anwar El Sadat, who ran unopposed. In Egypt he won with 90% of the vote, with a turnout of 85%.

Results

Egypt

References

United Arab
President
Presidential elections in Egypt
Referendums in the United Arab Republic
Single-candidate elections